Antonis Manikas (born 9 February 1959) is a Greek football manager and former player.

Managerial career
As a manager, Manikas was announced as Ethnikos Piraeus manager on 6 June 2008, but he officially resigned on 10 October 2008, after just four weeks of the Beta Ethniki 2009-09 season.

Playing career
As a player, Manikas was a goalkeeper.  He spent the majority of his career with Panionios, but also played for Levadiakos, PAS Giannina, Ethnikos Piraeus, and Kallithea.

During his career Manikas earned 2 caps for Greece. He made his debut in a friendly against Romania on 11 March 1987.

References

1959 births
Living people
Panionios F.C. players
Levadiakos F.C. players
PAS Giannina F.C. players
Kallithea F.C. players
Ethnikos Piraeus F.C. players
Greece international footballers
Association football goalkeepers
Greek football managers
Kallithea F.C. managers
Atromitos F.C. managers
Ethnikos Asteras F.C. managers
Rodos F.C. managers
Vyzas F.C. managers
Agios Dimitrios F.C. managers
Ethnikos Piraeus F.C. managers
Thrasyvoulos F.C. managers
Footballers from Athens
Greek footballers